This is a list of electoral results for the Electoral district of Cue in Western Australian state elections.

Members for Cue

Election results

Elections in the 1920s

Elections in the 1910s

Elections in the 1900s

References

Western Australian state electoral results by district